Perry John Dahl (February 18, 1923) is a retired United States Air Force colonel and a flying ace, who was credited in destroying 9 enemy aircraft in aerial combat during World War II.

Early life
Born on February 18, 1923, in North Battleford, Saskatchewan, Canada, Dahl and his family immigrated to the United States, where they settled in Seattle, Washington. He attended three years of high school before enlisting in the military.

Military career
On June 17, 1940, Dahl enlisted in the Washington National Guard and after completion of training, was assigned to the 41st Infantry Division. In the aftermath the Japanese attack on Pearl Harbor on December 7, 1941, he entered the Aviation Cadet Program of the U.S. Army Air Forces on September 26, 1942. On June 22, 1943, he was awarded his pilot wings and was commissioned as a second lieutenant at Williams Field in Arizona.

World War II

After the completion of training in the Lockheed P-38 Lightning, Dahl was assigned to the 55th Fighter Group at Tumwater, Washington. In October 1943, he was sent to the South West Pacific theatre where he was assigned to the 432d Fighter Squadron of the 475th Fighter Group at Dobodura Airfield in New Guinea. Flying P-38 Lightnings in aerial combat, Dahl scored his first aerial victory in his first mission on November 9, 1943, when he shot a Mitsubishi A6M "Zero" while escorting A-20 Havocs and B-25 Mitchells on a strike against a Japanese airfield in Alexishafen. On December 22, he shot down another Zero over Wewak, his second aerial victory. On January 23, 1944, he scored his third aerial victory after shooting down a Zero over Wewak and on February 24, Dahl took off from Nadzab on a mission against the Japanese-held Momote Airfield. Due to bad weather, he was forced to turn back from the mission and diverted to an airfield in Cape Gloucester and while landing, his P-38 collided with a B-24 Liberator on the runway.

In April 1944, he was promoted to the rank of captain and became operations officer of the 479th FG. On April 3, during a mission over Hollandia, Dutch East Indies, he shot down a Zero and a Nakajima Ki-43 "Oscar", bringing his total to five aerial victories and hence earning the title of flying ace. He shot down another Oscar, his sixth aerial victory, on June 8. The 475th FG moved to the Philippines in October 1944 and was stationed at San Pablo Airfield in Leyte during the Philippines campaign. On November 10, 1944, while escorting B-25s attacking Japanese shipping at Ormoc Bay, Dahl's P-38 formation were intercepted by a formation of Kawasaki Ki-61 "Tonys" flying in close formation towards east. The P-38s made a first pass and Dahl managed to shoot down one of the Tonys, his seventh aerial victory. While turning for a second pass, Dahl's P-38 collided with another P-38 flown by 2nd Lt. Grady Laseter Jr. As a result of the collision, Dahl ditched his P-38 in Ormoc Bay, while Laseter was killed after he was unable to bail out and crashed into the sea. Dahl was initially captured by a Japanese Army patrol before being rescued by the Philippine resistance who hid him until he returned to American lines on December 10.

On January 15, 1945, Dahl returned to duty and on March 5, he scored his eighth aerial victory, a Mitsubishi Ki-21 "Sally" bomber. Dahl shot down a Mitsubishi A6M3-32 "Hamp", his ninth and final aerial victory on March 28, 1945, during an escort of bombers attacking a Japanese naval convoy off the coast of French Indochina, for which he received the Silver Star.

During World War II, Dahl was credited with destroying 9 enemy aircraft in aerial combat while flying 158 combat missions. While serving with the 475th FG, one of his P-38s bore the name "Skidoo".

Post war
Dahl returned to the United States in June 1945 and after the end of World War II, he left military service briefly to attend University of Washington and University of Southern Colorado, where he graduated from the latter with a bachelor of science degree. He was employed with the Seattle Post-Intelligencer for a short period time until he was recalled to active duty with the United States Air Force in 1951, and was stationed at Kelly Air Force Base in Texas and Châteauroux-Déols Air Base in France, from February 1951 to June 1954. From 1954 to 1957, he was assigned to the Flying Safety Branch at Norton Air Force Base in California. After attending Air Command and Staff College at Maxwell Air Force Base in Alabama, Dahl continued to serve in numerous staff positions including at the Air Force headquarters in the Pentagon from 1966 to 1970.

During the Vietnam War, Dahl served with the 19th Tactical Air Support Squadron at Bien Hoa Air Base in South Vietnam from June 1970 to June 1971. After his return to the United States, he was assigned to the United States Air Force Academy in Colorado Springs, Colorado, where he served as the Deputy Commandant for the Cadet Wing and then Vice Commandant of Cadets from June 1971 to July 1974. In his second tour of duty during the Vietnam War, he was assigned to Nakhon Phanom Royal Thai Air Force Base where he served as commander of the 56th Special Operations Wing from July 1974 to April 1975.

In April 1975, he was assigned as the Deputy Chief of Staff for Plans and Programs with Headquarters Aerospace Defense Command and North American Aerospace Defense Command until his retirement from the Air Force on 1978.

Aerial victories

SOURCE: 475th Fighter Group Historical Foundation

Later life

The Planes of Fame Museum in Chino, California restored a P-38 and applied it with painting and decals of Dahl's P-38 "Skidoo". The P-38 is now flown at airshows with the Air Force Heritage Flight Foundation.

In 2015, he along with other flying aces received the Congressional Gold Medal, in recognition of "their heroic military service and defense of the country's freedom throughout the history of aviation warfare."

On 18 February 2023, he turned 100 years old, making him a centenarian.

Awards and decorations

Silver Star citation

Dahl, Perry J.
Captain, U.S. Army Air Forces
432d Fighter Squadron, 475th Fighter Group, Far East Air Forces
Date of Action: March 28, 1945

Citation:

References

External links

Biography at the Pearl Harbor Aviation Museum website
Video interview (2012)

1923 births
Living people
People from North Battleford
Canadian emigrants to the United States
Military personnel from Seattle
Aviators from Washington (state)
Recipients of the Silver Star
Recipients of the Legion of Merit
Recipients of the Distinguished Flying Cross (United States)
Recipients of the Meritorious Service Medal (United States)
Recipients of the Air Medal
United States Army Air Forces officers
United States Army Air Forces pilots of World War II
American World War II flying aces
United States Air Force colonels
United States Air Force personnel of the Vietnam War
Washington National Guard personnel
American centenarians
Men centenarians